The list of Uruguayan footballers in Serie B records the association football players from Uruguay who have appeared at least once for a team in the Italian Serie B. Entries in bold denote players still active in actual season.

A
Nelson Abeijón – Cagliari, Como – 2000–04
Mathías Abero – Avellino, Bologna – 2013–15
Rodrigo Aguirre – Perugia – 2015–16
Nicolás Albarracín – Spezia – 2012–14
Juan Alberti – Palermo – 1936–39
Matías Alonso – Bari – 2013–14
Nicolás Amodio – Napoli, Treviso, Mantova, Piacenza, Portogruaro – 2006–08, 2009–11
Gustavo Aprile – Bari – 2012–13
Maximiliano Arias - Brescia - 2012-13
Felipe Avenatti – Ternana – 2013–17

B
Jaime Báez – Livorno, Spezia, Pescara, Cosenza, Cremonese, Frosinone – 2015–
Raúl Banfi – Modena, Mantova, Prato – 1940–41, 1942–43, 1945–47
Daniel Baldi – Treviso – 2006–07
Santiago Bellini – Pescara – 2018–19
Rubén Bentancourt – Bologna – 2014–15
Mariano Bogliacino – Napoli, Bari – 2006–07, 2011–12
Nicolás Suárez Bremec – Arezzo, Ascoli, Grosseto, Vicenza – 2005–08, 2012–13, 2014–15
Gaston Brugman – Empoli, Grosseto, Pescara, Parma – 2010–15, 2017–19, 2021–22

C
Pablo Eduardo Caballero – Reggina – 2013–14
Washington Cacciavillani – Pro Patria – 1956–57
Gastón Camaño – Empoli – 2011–12
Jorge Daniel Casanova – Ravenna – 2000–01
Angel Cerilla – Napoli – 1948–49
Juan Ignacio Silva Cerón – Triestina – 2006–07
Javier Chevantón – Lecce – 2002–03

D
Juan Delgado – Crotone – 2015–16

E
Edgar Elizalde – Pescara – 2017–18, 2019–20

F
Cesar Falletti – Ternana, Palermo – 2013–17, 2018–19, 2021–
Maximilián Faotto – Palermo – 1936–37
Mateo Figoli – Triestina – 2008–10
Darío Flores – Perugia – 2014–15
José María Franco – Torino – 2003–05
Ricardo Alberto Frione – Sanremese – 1938–39

G

Carlos Andrés García – Venezia – 2004–05
Guillermo Giacomazzi – Lecce, Siena, Perugia – 2002–03, 2006–07, 2009–10, 2013–15
Henry Damián Giménez – Perugia – 2012–13
Walter Gomez – Palermo – 1957–58
Alejandro González – Ternana, Avellino, Perugia – 2015–18
Pablo Granoche – Triestina, Varese, Padova, Cesena, Modena, Spezia – 2007–09, 2011–18
Gianni Guigou – Treviso – 2006–09
Nelson Gutierrez – Verona – 1990–91

H
Abel Hernández – Palermo – 2013–14

I
Oliviero Icardi – Palermo, Verona – 1936–37, 1938–40
Salvador Ichazo – Bari – 2016–17

L
Luis La Paz – Napoli – 1948–50
Norberto Liguera – Anconitana, Bologna – 1938–40
Marcelo Lipatin – Bari – 2003–05
Ignacio Lores Varela – Palermo, Bari, Vicenza, Pisa, Ascoli, Cittadella – 2013–15, 2016–18, 2021–
Diego López – Cagliari – 2000–04
Walter Alberto Lopez – Brescia, Benevento, Spezia, Salernitana – 2009–10, 2016–21
Hernán Rodrigo López – Torino – 1998–99

M 
Damián Macaluso – Venezia – 2004–05
Jorge Andrés Martínez – Novara – 2013–14
Matías Masiero – Pisa – 2008–09
Gonzalo Mastriani – Crotone – 2013–14
Alan Matturro – Genoa – 2022–
Gustavo Méndez – Torino – 2000–01
Leonardo Martin Miglionico – Piacenza, Livorno – 2004–09, 2010–12
Paolo Montero – Atalanta – 1994–95

N
Nahitan Nández – Cagliari – 2022–

O
Fabián O'Neill – Cagliari – 1997–98
Agustín Olivera – Modena – 2015–16
Rubén Olivera – Brescia, Latina – 2013–16
Renzo Orihuela – Palermo – 2022–

P
Pablo Pallante – Gallipoli – 2009–10
Gastón Pereiro – Cagliari – 2022–23
Diego Pérez – Bologna – 2014–15
Diego Perrone – Catania – 2005–06
Diego Polenta – Bari – 2011–14

R
Gastón Ramírez – Monza – 2021–22
Juan Manuel Ramos – Catania, Spezia – 2014–15, 2019–20
Nicolas Riccardi – Palermo – 1936–37
Alexis Rolín – Catania – 2014–15
Marcel Román – Frosinone – 2008–09

S

Andrés Schetino – Cosenza – 2018–19
Darío Silva – Cagliari – 1997–98
Cristian Sosa – Gallipoli, Cittadella – 2009–10, 2012–14
Juan Surraco – Messina, Ancona, Livorno, Modena, Cittadella, Ternana – 2007–15, 2016–17

T
Lucas Torreira – Pescara – 2014–16
Hugo Tortora – Reggiana – 1940–41
Victor Tortora – Palermo, Venezia – 1936–39, 1945–46

V
Carlos Adrián Valdez – Treviso, Reggina, Siena – 2006–07, 2009–11
Agustín Viana – Gallipoli – 2009–10
Gonzalo Germán Vicente – Venezia – 2004–05

Z
Marcelo Zalayeta – Juventus – 2006–07

See also
List of foreign Serie B players
List of Uruguayan footballers in Serie A

Notes

References

Italy
Serie B footballers
Expatriate footballers in Italy
Uruguayan expatriate footballers
Uruguayan expatriate footballers
Association football player non-biographical articles